Dactylosporangium maewongense is a bacterium from the genus Dactylosporangium which has been isolated from soil from the Mae Wong National Park, Thailand.

References

 

Micromonosporaceae
Bacteria described in 2010